Tatjana Fomina (born April 26, 1954 in Tallinn) is an Estonian chess player holding the title of Woman Grandmaster and twice European senior women's champion.

Chess career
Fomina started play chess in Tallinn's Pioneers Palace. In 1969 and 1970 she twice won Estonian juniors chess championship. In 1971 she won USSR junior's Championship in Riga.

During the period from 1971 to 1983 Fomina nine times participated in USSR Women's Chess Championships. The best result - silver medal in 1975. In 1976 she shared 8th - 9th place with Milunka Lazarević in Women's Interzonal (Roosendaal).
In 1985, 1988 and 1990 she won Baltic Women's Chess Championships.

Tatjana Fomina is ten times Estonian Women's Chess Championship winner (1977—78, 1983, 1989, 1992, 1998, 2002—03, 2012—13). Also she had five silver (1973—74, 1988, 1997, 2007) and eight bronze (1975, 1982, 1984, 1990—91, 1993—95) Estonian Women's Chess Championship medals.
Fomina had 12 titles of Estonian rapid chess champion (1990, 1998—2000, 2003—05, 2007—09, 2011—12) and 8 titles of Estonian blitz chess champion (2004—09, 2011—12).

Tatjana Fomina won the bronze medal at the Women's World Senior Chess Championship five times (2005, 2006, 2008, 2009, 2010). In 2012, she won the Women's European Senior Chess Championship in Kaunas and also took silver (2007) and bronze (2006) medals in this competitions. She won the age category 50+ of the same event in 2014, when for the first time the senior championships were split in two divisions (50+ and 65+).

Team chess results
Fomina played for Estonia in Chess Olympiads:
 In 1992, at first board in the 30th Chess Olympiad in Manila (+5 −3 =5);
 In 1994, at second board in the 31st Chess Olympiad in Moscow (+5 −4 =3);
 In 1996, at second board in the 32nd Chess Olympiad in Yerevan (+7 −3 =3);
 In 1998, at second board in the 33rd Chess Olympiad in Elista (+6 −3 =2);
 In 2000, at second board in the 34th Chess Olympiad in Istanbul (+8 −3 =2);
 In 2002, at first board in the 35th Chess Olympiad in Bled (+5 −7 =1);
 In 2010, at first board in the 39th Chess Olympiad in Khanty-Mansiysk (+1 −7 =0);
 In 2012, at second board in the 40th Chess Olympiad in Istanbul (+4 −3 =2);
 In 2014, at fourth board in the 41st Chess Olympiad in Tromsø (+5 −3 =0).

Fomina played for Estonia in European Team Chess Championship:
 In 1992, at first board in Debrecen (+3 −5 =1);
 In 2007, at second board in Heraklion (+2 −3 =3).

Personal life
Tatjana Fomina graduated from secondary school in Tallinn (1971), faculty of law in University of Tartu (1980) and faculty of foreign languages in Tallinn University (2002). She worked as chess trainer and as legal professional.

References

External links
Biography in Estonian Sports Lexicon

 chess games at 365chess.com

1954 births
Living people
Chess woman grandmasters
Estonian female chess players
Soviet female chess players
University of Tartu alumni
Tallinn University alumni
Sportspeople from Tallinn
Estonian people of Russian descent